Rodia may refer to:

 Rodia, Achaea, Greece
 Rodia, Grevena, Greece
 Rodia, Larissa, Greece
 Relative Optical Density Image Analysis (RODIA)
 Simon Rodia, Italian-American architect who created the Watts Towers in Los Angeles
 Rodia (Star Wars), a fictional minor planet in the Star Wars franchise